Tupla may refer to 

 Tupla (chocolate), Finnish chocolate bar
 Tupla, Pakistan, village in Khyber Pakhtunkhwa, Pakistan